Dinita Gohil is a British actress. She is best known for her performance as Amanda in the satirical film Greed (2019), and on-stage as Viola in the Royal Shakespeare Company production of Twelfth Night (2017–2018).

Early life
Dinita Gohil was born in Hodge Hill, Birmingham. She was educated at Sutton Coldfield Grammar School for Girls, and later studied Spanish and French language at Royal Holloway, University of London. Gohil received a Master of Arts from the Guildhall School of Music and Drama, where she studied acting for three years.

Career
Before acting, Gohil worked as a translator. In 1999, Gohil began her on-screen acting career in the post-apocalyptic miniseries, The Last Train as Anita Nixon. In 2017, Gohil played Sajani in the National Geographic documentary and science fiction television series, Year Million.

From 2017 to 2018, Gohil played Viola in the Royal Shakespeare Company production of Twelfth Night, written by William Shakespeare. In a three-star review for The Guardian, Michael Billington called Gohil's performance "the best performance of the evening, [...] a bright-eyed figure who surrenders happily to Orsino's kisses and who delivers the famous "willow cabin" speech with a level of rapture I have not heard in ages."

In 2019, Gohil played a leading role in the 2019 satirical film Greed as Amanda, a personal assistant of Sir Richard McCreadie (played by Steve Coogan). In April 2020, The Royal Shakespeare Company released the 2017 production of Twelfth Night which Gohil features in as Viola, on the streaming service Marquee TV.

Filmography

Television

Film

Stage

References

External links
 

Living people
20th-century English actresses
21st-century English actresses
Actresses from Birmingham, West Midlands
Alumni of the Guildhall School of Music and Drama
Alumni of Royal Holloway, University of London
British comedy actresses
British actresses of Indian descent
English film actresses
English stage actresses
English Shakespearean actresses
English television actresses
People educated at Sutton Coldfield Grammar School for Girls
Year of birth missing (living people)